Proschistis is a genus of moths belonging to the subfamily Olethreutinae of the family Tortricidae.

Species
Proschistis amphibola Diakonoff, 1973
Proschistis invida Meyrick, 1909
Proschistis marmaropa (Meyrick, 1907)
Proschistis petromacha (Meyrick, 1931)
Proschistis polyochtha Diakonoff, 1973
Proschistis sideroxyla (Meyrick, 1931)
Proschistis stygnopa Meyrick, in Caradja & Meyrick, 1935
Proschistis zaleuta Meyrick, 1907

See also
List of Tortricidae genera

References

External links
tortricidae.com

Tortricidae genera
Olethreutinae
Taxa named by Edward Meyrick